The ARM Cortex-M is a group of 32-bit RISC ARM processor cores licensed by ARM Limited.  These cores are optimized for low-cost and energy-efficient integrated circuits, which have been embedded in tens of billions of consumer devices.  Though they are most often the main component of microcontroller chips, sometimes they are embedded inside other types of chips too.  The Cortex-M family consists of Cortex-M0, Cortex-M0+, Cortex-M1, Cortex-M3, Cortex-M4, Cortex-M7, Cortex-M23, Cortex-M33, Cortex-M35P, Cortex-M55, Cortex-M85.  A floating-point unit (FPU) option is available for Cortex-M4 / M7 / M33 / M35P / M55 / M85 cores, and when included in the silicon these cores are sometimes known as "Cortex-MxF", where 'x' is the core variant.

Overview

The ARM Cortex-M family are ARM microprocessor cores which are designed for use in microcontrollers, ASICs, ASSPs, FPGAs, and SoCs.  Cortex-M cores are commonly used as dedicated microcontroller chips, but also are "hidden" inside of SoC chips as power management controllers, I/O controllers, system controllers, touch screen controllers, smart battery controllers, and sensors controllers.

The main difference from the Cortex-A core is that there is no memory management unit (MMU). A full-fledged operating system does not normally run on this class of processor.

Though 8-bit microcontrollers were very popular in the past, Cortex-M has slowly been chipping away at the 8-bit market as the prices of low-end Cortex-M chips have moved downward.  Cortex-M have become a popular replacements for 8-bit chips in applications that benefit from 32-bit math operations, and replacing older legacy ARM cores such as ARM7 and ARM9.

License
ARM Limited neither manufactures nor sells CPU devices based on its own designs, but rather licenses the processor architecture to interested parties. Arm offers a variety of licensing terms, varying in cost and deliverables. To all licensees, Arm provides an integratable hardware description of the ARM core, as well as complete software development toolset and the right to sell manufactured silicon containing the ARM CPU.

Silicon customization
Integrated Device Manufacturers (IDM) receive the ARM Processor IP as synthesizable RTL (written in Verilog). In this form, they have the ability to perform architectural level optimizations and extensions. This allows the manufacturer to achieve custom design goals, such as higher clock speed, very low power consumption, instruction set extensions (including floating point), optimizations for size, debug support, etc.  To determine which components have been included in a particular ARM CPU chip, consult the manufacturer datasheet and related documentation.

Some of the silicon options for the Cortex-M cores are:
 SysTick timer: A 24-bit system timer that extends the functionality of both the processor and the Nested Vectored Interrupt Controller (NVIC). When present, it also provides an additional configurable priority SysTick interrupt. Though the SysTick timer is optional for the M0/M0+/M1/M23, it is extremely rare to find a Cortex-M microcontroller without it.  If a Cortex-M33/M35P/M55/M85 microcontroller has the Security Extension option, then it optionally can have two SysTicks (one Secure, one Non-secure).
 Bit-Band: Maps a complete word of memory onto a single bit in the bit-band region. For example, writing to an alias word will set or clear the corresponding bit in the bit-band region. This allows every individual bit in the bit-band region to be directly accessible from a word-aligned address. In particular, individual bits can be set, cleared, or toggled from C/C++ without performing a read-modify-write sequence of instructions.  Though the bit-band is optional, it is less common to find a Cortex-M3 and Cortex-M4 microcontroller without it.  Some Cortex-M0 and Cortex-M0+ microcontrollers have bit-band. 
 Memory Protection Unit (MPU): Provides support for protecting regions of memory through enforcing privilege and access rules. It supports up to sixteen different regions, each of which can be split further into equal-size sub-regions.
 Tightly-Coupled Memory (TCM): Low-latency (zero wait state) SRAM that can be used to hold the call stack, RTOS control structures, interrupt data structures, interrupt handler code, and speed critical code.  Other than CPU cache, TCM is the fastest memory in an ARM Cortex-M microcontroller.  Since TCM isn't cached and accessable at the same speed as the processor and cache, it could be conceptually described as "addressable cache".  There is an ITCM (Instruction TCM) and a DTCM (Data TCM) to allow a Harvard architecture processor to read from both simultaneously.  The DTCM can't contain any instructions, but the ITCM can contain data.  Since TCM is tightly connected to the processor core, DMA engines might not be able to access TCM on some implementations.

 Note: Most Cortex-M3 and M4 chips have bit-band and MPU.  The bit-band option can be added to the M0/M0+ using the Cortex-M System Design Kit.
 Note: Software should validate the existence of each feature before attempting to use it.
 Note: Limited public information is available for the Cortex-M35P until its Technical Reference Manual is released.

Additional silicon options:
 Data endianness: Little-endian or big-endian.  Unlike legacy ARM cores, the Cortex-M is permanently fixed in silicon as one of these choices.
 Interrupts: 1 to 32 (M0/M0+/M1), 1 to 240 (M3/M4/M7/M23), 1 to 480 (M33/M35P/M55/M85).
 Wake-up interrupt controller: Optional.
 Vector Table Offset Register: Optional. (not available for M0).
 Instruction fetch width: 16-bit only, or mostly 32-bit.
 User/privilege support: Optional.
 Reset all registers: Optional.
 Single-cycle I/O port: Optional. (M0+/M23).
 Debug Access Port (DAP): None, SWD, JTAG and SWD. (optional for all Cortex-M cores)
 Halting debug support: Optional.
 Number of watchpoint comparators: 0 to 2 (M0/M0+/M1), 0 to 4 (M3/M4/M7/M23/M33/M35P/M55/M85).
 Number of breakpoint comparators: 0 to 4 (M0/M0+/M1/M23), 0 to 8 (M3/M4/M7/M33/M35P/M55/M85).

Instruction sets

The Cortex-M0 / M0+ / M1 implement the ARMv6-M architecture, the Cortex-M3 implements the ARMv7-M architecture, the Cortex-M4 / Cortex-M7 implements the ARMv7E-M architecture, the Cortex-M23 / M33 / M35P implement the ARMv8-M architecture, and the Cortex-M55 / M85 implements the ARMv8.1-M architecture. The architectures are binary instruction upward compatible from ARMv6-M to ARMv7-M to ARMv7E-M. Binary instructions available for the Cortex-M0 / Cortex-M0+ / Cortex-M1 can execute without modification on the Cortex-M3 / Cortex-M4 / Cortex-M7. Binary instructions available for the Cortex-M3 can execute without modification on the Cortex-M4 / Cortex-M7 / Cortex-M33 / Cortex-M35P.  Only Thumb-1 and Thumb-2 instruction sets are supported in Cortex-M architectures; the legacy 32-bit ARM instruction set isn't supported.

All Cortex-M cores implement a common subset of instructions that consists of most Thumb-1, some Thumb-2, including a 32-bit result multiply.  The Cortex-M0 / Cortex-M0+ / Cortex-M1 / Cortex-M23 were designed to create the smallest silicon die, thus having the fewest instructions of the Cortex-M family.

The Cortex-M0 / M0+ / M1 include Thumb-1 instructions, except new instructions (CBZ, CBNZ, IT) which were added in ARMv7-M architecture.  The Cortex-M0 / M0+ / M1 include a minor subset of Thumb-2 instructions (BL, DMB, DSB, ISB, MRS, MSR).  The Cortex-M3 / M4 / M7 / M33 / M35P have all base Thumb-1 and Thumb-2 instructions.  The Cortex-M3 adds three Thumb-1 instructions, all Thumb-2 instructions, hardware integer divide, and saturation arithmetic instructions.  The Cortex-M4 adds DSP instructions and an optional single-precision floating-point unit (VFPv4-SP).  The Cortex-M7 adds an optional double-precision FPU (VFPv5).  The Cortex-M23 / M33 / M35P / M55 / M85 add TrustZone instructions.

 Note: Interrupt latency cycle count assumes: 1) stack located in zero-wait state RAM, 2) another interrupt function not currently executing, 3) Security Extension option doesn't exist, because it adds additional cycles. The Cortex-M cores with a Harvard computer architecture have a shorter interrupt latency than Cortex-M cores with a Von Neumann computer architecture.
 Note: The Cortex-M series includes three new 16-bit Thumb-1 instructions for sleep mode: SEV, WFE, WFI.
 Note: The Cortex-M0 / M0+ / M1 doesn't include these 16-bit Thumb-1 instructions: CBZ, CBNZ, IT.
 Note: The Cortex-M0 / M0+ / M1 only include these 32-bit Thumb-2 instructions: BL, DMB, DSB, ISB, MRS, MSR.
 Note: The Cortex-M0 / M0+ / M1 / M23 only has 32-bit multiply instructions with a lower-32-bit result (32-bit × 32-bit = lower 32-bit), where as the Cortex-M3 / M4 / M7 / M33 / M35P includes additional 32-bit multiply instructions with 64-bit results (32bit × 32bit = 64bit). The Cortex-M4 / M7 (optionally M33 / M35P) include DSP instructions for (16-bit × 16-bit = 32-bit), (32-bit × 16-bit = upper 32-bit), (32-bit × 32-bit = upper 32-bit) multiplications. 
 Note: The number of cycles to complete multiply and divide instructions vary across ARM Cortex-M core designs.  Some cores have a silicon option for the choice of fast speed or small size (slow speed), so cores have the option of using less silicon with the downside of higher cycle count. An interrupt occurring during the execution of a divide instruction or slow-iterative multiply instruction will cause the processor to abandon the instruction, then restart it after the interrupt returns.
 Multiply instructions "32-bit result" Cortex-M0/M0+/M23 is 1 or 32 cycle silicon option, Cortex-M1 is 3 or 33 cycle silicon option, Cortex-M3/M4/M7/M33/M35P is 1 cycle.
 Multiply instructions "64-bit result" Cortex-M3 is 3–5 cycles (depending on values), Cortex-M4/M7/M33/M35P is 1 cycle.
 Divide instructions Cortex-M3/M4 is 2–12 cycles (depending on values), Cortex-M7 is 3–20 cycles (depending on values), Cortex-M23 is 17 or 34 cycle option, Cortex-M33 is 2–11 cycles (depending on values), Cortex-M35P is TBD.
 Note: Some Cortex-M cores have silicon options for various types of floating point units (FPU). The Cortex-M55 / M85 has an option for half-precision (HP), the Cortex-M4 / M7 / M33 / M35P / M55 / M85 has an option for single-precision (SP), the Cortex-M7 / M55 / M85 has an option for double-precision (DP). When an FPU is included, the core is sometimes referred as "Cortex-MxF", where 'x' is the core variant, such as Cortex-M4F.

 Note: MOVW is an alias that means 32-bit "wide" MOV instruction.
 Note: For Cortex-M1, WFE / WFI / SEV instructions exist, but execute as a NOP instruction.
 Note: The half-precision (HP) FPU instructions are valid in the Cortex-M55 / M85 only when the HP FPU option exists in the silicon.
 Note: The single-precision (SP) FPU instructions are valid in the Cortex-M4 / M7 / M33 / M35P / M55 / M85 only when the SP FPU option exists in the silicon.
 Note: The double-precision (DP) FPU instructions are valid in the Cortex-M7 / M55 / M85 only when the DP FPU option exists in the silicon.

Deprecations
The ARM architecture for ARM Cortex-M series removed some features from older legacy cores:
 The 32-bit ARM instruction set is not included in Cortex-M cores.
 Endianness is chosen at silicon implementation in Cortex-M cores.  Legacy cores allowed "on-the-fly" changing of the data endian mode.
 Co-processor were not supported on Cortex-M cores, until the silicon option was reintroduced in "ARMv8-M Mainline" for ARM Cortex-M33/M35P cores.

The capabilities of the 32-bit ARM instruction set is duplicated in many ways by the Thumb-1 and Thumb-2 instruction sets, but some ARM features don't have a similar feature:
 The SWP and SWPB (swap) ARM instructions don't have a similar feature in Cortex-M.

The 16-bit Thumb-1 instruction set has evolved over time since it was first released in the legacy ARM7T cores with the ARMv4T architecture.  New Thumb-1 instructions were added as each legacy ARMv5 / ARMv6 / ARMv6T2 architectures were released. Some 16-bit Thumb-1 instructions were removed from the Cortex-M cores:
 The "BLX <immediate>" instruction doesn't exist because it was used to switch from Thumb-1 to ARM instruction set.  The "BLX <register>" instruction is still available in the Cortex-M.
 SETEND doesn't exist because on-the-fly switching of data endian mode is no longer supported.
 Co-processor instructions were not supported on Cortex-M cores, until the silicon option was reintroduced in "ARMv8-M Mainline" for ARM Cortex-M33/M35P cores.
 The SWI instruction was renamed to SVC, though the instruction binary coding is the same. However, the SVC handler code is different from the SWI handler code, because of changes to the exception models.

Cortex-M0

The Cortex-M0 core is optimized for small silicon die size and use in the lowest price chips.

Key features of the Cortex-M0 core are:
 ARMv6-M architecture
 3-stage pipeline
 Instruction sets:
 Thumb-1 (most), missing CBZ, CBNZ, IT
 Thumb-2 (some), only BL, DMB, DSB, ISB, MRS, MSR
 32-bit hardware integer multiply with 32-bit result
 1 to 32 interrupts, plus NMI

Silicon options:
 Hardware integer multiply speed: 1 or 32 cycles.

Chips

The following microcontrollers are based on the Cortex-M0 core:
 ABOV AC30M1x64
 Cypress PSoC 4000, 4100, 4100M, 4200, 4200DS, 4200L, 4200M 
 Infineon XMC1100, XMC1200, XMC1300, XMC1400, TLE984x
 Dialog DA1458x, DA1468x
 Nordic nRF51
 NXP LPC1100, LPC1200
 Nuvoton NuMicro
 Sonix SN32F700
 ST STM32 F0
 Toshiba TX00
 Vorago VA10800 (extreme temperature), VA10820 (radiation hardened)

The following chips have a Cortex-M0 as a secondary core:
 NXP LPC4300 (one Cortex-M4F + one Cortex-M0)
 Texas Instruments SimpleLink Wireless MCUs CC1310 and CC2650 (one programmable Cortex-M3 + one Cortex-M0 network processor + one proprietary Sensor Controller Engine)

Cortex-M0+

The Cortex-M0+ is an optimized superset of the Cortex-M0. The Cortex-M0+ has complete instruction set compatibility with the Cortex-M0 thus allowing the use of the same compiler and debug tools.  The Cortex-M0+ pipeline was reduced from 3 to 2 stages, which lowers the power usage. In addition to debug features in the existing Cortex-M0, a silicon option can be added to the Cortex-M0+ called the Micro Trace Buffer (MTB) which provides a simple instruction trace buffer. The Cortex-M0+ also received Cortex-M3 and Cortex-M4 features, which can be added as silicon options, such as the memory protection unit (MPU) and the vector table relocation.

Key features of the Cortex-M0+ core are:
 ARMv6-M architecture
 2-stage pipeline (one fewer than Cortex-M0)
 Instruction sets: (same as Cortex-M0)
 Thumb-1 (most), missing CBZ, CBNZ, IT
 Thumb-2 (some), only BL, DMB, DSB, ISB, MRS, MSR
 32-bit hardware integer multiply with 32-bit result
 1 to 32 interrupts, plus NMI

Silicon options:
 Hardware integer multiply speed: 1 or 32 cycles
 8-region memory protection unit (MPU) (same as M3 and M4)
 Vector table relocation (same as M3, M4)
 Single-cycle I/O port (available in M0+/M23)
 Micro Trace Buffer (MTB) (available in M0+/M23/M33/M35P)

Chips
The following microcontrollers are based on the Cortex-M0+ core:
 ABOV Semiconductor A31G11x, A31G12x, A31G314
 Cypress PSoC 4000S, 4100S, 4100S+, 4100PS, 4700S, FM0+
 Epson S1C31W74, S1C31D01, S1C31D50
 Holtek HT32F52000
 Microchip (Atmel) SAM C2, D0, D1, D2, DA, L2, R2, R3
 NXP LPC800, LPC11E60, LPC11U60
 NXP (Freescale) Kinetis E, EA, L, M, V1, W0, S32K11x
 Raspberry Pi RP2040 (two M0+ cores)
 Renesas S124, S128, RE, RE01
 Silicon Labs (Energy Micro) EFM32 Zero, Happy
 ST STM32 L0, G0

The following chips have a Cortex-M0+ as a secondary core:
 Cypress PSoC 6200 (one Cortex-M4F + one Cortex-M0+)
 ST WB (one Cortex-M4F + one Cortex-M0+)

The smallest ARM microcontrollers are of the Cortex-M0+ type (as of 2014, smallest at 1.6 mm by 2 mm in a chip-scale package is Kinetis KL03).

On 21 June 2018, the "world's smallest computer'", or computer device was announced based on the ARM Cortex-M0+ (and including RAM and wireless transmitters and receivers based on photovoltaics) by University of Michigan researchers at the 2018 Symposia on VLSI Technology and Circuits with the paper "A 0.04mm3 16nW Wireless and Batteryless Sensor System with Integrated Cortex-M0+ Processor and Optical Communication for Cellular Temperature Measurement." The device is one-tenth the size of IBM's previously claimed world-record-sized computer from months back in March 2018, which is smaller than a grain of salt.

Cortex-M1

The Cortex-M1 is an optimized core especially designed to be loaded into FPGA chips.

Key features of the Cortex-M1 core are:
 ARMv6-M architecture
 3-stage pipeline.
 Instruction sets:
 Thumb-1 (most), missing CBZ, CBNZ, IT.
 Thumb-2 (some), only BL, DMB, DSB, ISB, MRS, MSR.
 32-bit hardware integer multiply with 32-bit result.
 1 to 32 interrupts, plus NMI.

Silicon options:
 Hardware integer multiply speed: 3 or 33 cycles.
 Optional Tightly-Coupled Memory (TCM): 0 to 1 MB instruction-TCM, 0 to 1 MB data-TCM, each with optional ECC.
 External interrupts: 0, 1, 8, 16, 32.
 Debug: none, reduced, full.
 Data endianness: little-endian or BE-8 big-endian. 
 OS extension: present or absent.

Chips
The following vendors support the Cortex-M1 as soft-cores on their FPGA chips:
 Altera Cyclone-II, Cyclone-III, Stratix-II, Stratix-III
 GOWIN M1 
 Actel/Microsemi/Microchip Fusion, IGLOO/e, ProASIC3L, ProASIC3/E
 Xilinx Spartan-3, Virtex-2, Virtex-3, Virtex-4, Artix-7

Cortex-M3

Key features of the Cortex-M3 core are: 
 ARMv7-M architecture
 3-stage pipeline with branch speculation.
 Instruction sets:
 Thumb-1 (entire).
 Thumb-2 (entire).
 32-bit hardware integer multiply with 32-bit or 64-bit result, signed or unsigned, add or subtract after the multiply. 32-bit multiply is 1 cycle, but 64-bit multiply and MAC instructions require extra cycles.
 32-bit hardware integer divide (2–12 cycles).
 saturation arithmetic support.
 1 to 240 interrupts, plus NMI.
 12 cycle interrupt latency.
 Integrated sleep modes.

Silicon options:
 Optional Memory Protection Unit (MPU): 0 or 8 regions.

Chips
The following microcontrollers are based on the Cortex-M3 core:
 ABOV AC33Mx128, AC33Mx064
 Actel/Microsemi/Microchip SmartFusion, SmartFusion 2 (FPGA)
 Analog Devices ADUCM360, ADUCM361, ADUCM3029
 Broadcom Wi-Fi Chip BCM4319XKUBG
 Cypress PSoC 5000, 5000LP, FM3
 Holtek HT32F
 Infineon TLE9860, TLE987x
 Microchip (Atmel) SAM 3A, 3N, 3S, 3U, 3X
 NXP LPC1300, LPC1700, LPC1800
 ON Semiconductor Q32M210
 Realtek RTL8710
 Silicon Labs Precision32
 Silicon Labs (Energy Micro) EFM32 Tiny, Gecko, Leopard, Giant
 ST STM32 F1, F2, L1, W
 TDK-Micronas HVC4223F
 Texas Instruments F28, LM3, TMS470, OMAP 4, SimpleLink Wireless MCUs (CC1310 Sub-GHz and CC2650 BLE+Zigbee+6LoWPAN)
 Toshiba TX03

The following chips have a Cortex-M3 as a secondary core:
 Apple A9 (Cortex-M3 as integrated M9 motion co-processor)
 CSR Quatro 5300 (Cortex-M3 as co-processor)
 Samsung Exynos 7420 (Cortex-M3 as a DVS microcontroller)
 Texas Instruments F28, LM3, TMS470, OMAP 4470 (one Cortex-A9 + two Cortex-M3)
 XMOS XS1-XA (seven xCORE + one Cortex-M3)

The following FPGAs include a Cortex-M3 core:
 Microsemi SmartFusion2 SoC

The following vendors support the Cortex-M3 as soft-cores on their FPGA chips:
 Altera Cyclone-II, Cyclone-III, Stratix-II, Stratix-III
 Xilinx Spartan-3, Virtex-2, Virtex-3, Virtex-4, Artix-7

Cortex-M4

Conceptually the Cortex-M4 is a Cortex-M3 plus DSP instructions, and optional floating-point unit (FPU). A core with an FPU is known as Cortex-M4F.

Key features of the Cortex-M4 core are:
 ARMv7E-M architecture
 3-stage pipeline with branch speculation.
 Instruction sets:
 Thumb-1 (entire).
 Thumb-2 (entire).
 32-bit hardware integer multiply with 32-bit or 64-bit result, signed or unsigned, add or subtract after the multiply. 32-bit Multiply and MAC are 1 cycle.
 32-bit hardware integer divide (2–12 cycles).
 Saturation arithmetic support.
 DSP extension: Single cycle 16/32-bit MAC, single cycle dual 16-bit MAC, 8/16-bit SIMD arithmetic.
 1 to 240 interrupts, plus NMI.
 12 cycle interrupt latency.
 Integrated sleep modes.

Silicon options:
 Optional floating-point unit (FPU): single-precision only IEEE-754 compliant. It is called the FPv4-SP extension.
 Optional memory protection unit (MPU): 0 or 8 regions.

Chips

The following microcontrollers are based on the Cortex-M4 core:
 Analog Devices ADSP-CM40x
 Microchip (Atmel) SAM 4L, 4N, 4S
 NXP (Freescale) Kinetis K, W2
 Texas Instruments SimpleLink Wi-Fi CC32xx, CC32xxMOD

The following microcontrollers are based on the Cortex-M4F (M4 + FPU) core:
 Analog Devices ADUCM4050
 Cypress 6200 (one Cortex-M4F + one Cortex-M0+), FM4
 Infineon XMC4000
 Maxim Darwin
 Microchip (Atmel) SAM4C (Dual core: one Cortex-M4F + one Cortex-M4), SAM4E, SAM4L, SAM4N, SAM4S, SAMG5, SAMD5/E5x
 Nordic nRF52
 Nuvoton NuMicro M480
 NXP LPC4000, LPC4300 (one Cortex-M4F + one Cortex-M0), LPC54000
 NXP (Freescale) Kinetis K, V3, V4, S32K14x
 Renesas S3, S5, S7, RA4, RA6
 Silicon Labs (Energy Micro) EFM32 Wonder
 ST STM32 F3, F4, L4, L4+, G4, WB (one Cortex-M4F + one Cortex-M0+)
 Texas Instruments LM4F, TM4C, MSP432, CC13x2R, CC1352P, CC26x2R
 Toshiba TX04

The following chips have either a Cortex-M4 or M4F as a secondary core:
 NXP (Freescale) Vybrid VF6 (one Cortex-A5 + one Cortex-M4F)
 NXP (Freescale) i.MX 6 SoloX (one Cortex-A9 + one Cortex-M4F)
 NXP (Freescale) i.MX 7 Solo/Dual (one or two Cortex-A7 + one Cortex-M4F)
 NXP (Freescale) i.MX 8 (two Cortex-A72 + four Cortex-A53 + two Cortex-M4F)
 NXP (Freescale) i.MX 8M and 8M Mini (four Cortex-A53 + one Cortex-M4F)
 NXP (Freescale) i.MX 8X (four Cortex-A35 + one Cortex-M4F)
 ST STM32MP1 (one or two Cortex-A7 + one Cortex-M4)
 Texas Instruments OMAP 5 (two Cortex-A15s + two Cortex-M4)
 Texas Instruments Sitara AM5700 (one or two Cortex-A15s + two Cortex-M4s as image processing units + two Cortex-M4s as general purpose units)

Cortex-M7

The Cortex-M7 is a high-performance core with almost double the power efficiency of the older Cortex-M4. It features a 6-stage superscalar pipeline with branch prediction and an optional floating-point unit capable of single-precision and optionally double-precision operations.  The instruction and data buses have been enlarged to 64-bit wide over the previous 32-bit buses.  If a core contains an FPU, it is known as a Cortex-M7F, otherwise it is a Cortex-M7.

Key features of the Cortex-M7 core are:
 ARMv7E-M architecture.
 6-stage pipeline with branch speculation. Longest of all ARM Cortex-M cores.
 Instruction sets:
 Thumb-1 (entire).
 Thumb-2 (entire).
 32-bit hardware integer multiply with 32-bit or 64-bit result, signed or unsigned, add or subtract after the multiply. 32-bit Multiply and MAC are 1 cycle.
 32-bit hardware integer divide (2–12 cycles).
 Saturation arithmetic support.
 DSP extension: Single cycle 16/32-bit MAC, single cycle dual 16-bit MAC, 8/16-bit SIMD arithmetic.
 1 to 240 interrupts, plus NMI.
 12 cycle interrupt latency.
 Integrated sleep modes.

Silicon options:
 Optional floating-point unit (FPU): (single precision) or (single and double-precision), both IEEE-754-2008 compliant. It is called the FPv5 extension.
 Optional CPU cache: 0 to 64 KB instruction-cache, 0 to 64 KB data-cache, each with optional ECC.
 Optional Tightly-Coupled Memory (TCM): 0 to 16 MB instruction-TCM, 0 to 16 MB data-TCM, each with optional ECC.
 Optional Memory Protection Unit (MPU): 8 or 16 regions.
 Optional Embedded Trace Macrocell (ETM): instruction-only, or instruction and data.
 Optional Retention Mode (with Arm Power Management Kit) for Sleep Modes.

Chips
The following microcontrollers are based on the Cortex-M7 core:
 Microchip (Atmel) SAM E7, S7, V7
 NXP (Freescale) Kinetis KV5x, i.MX RT, S32K3xx
 ST STM32 F7, H7

Cortex-M23

The Cortex-M23 core was announced in October 2016 and based on the ARMv8-M architecture that was previously announced in November 2015.  Conceptually the Cortex-M23 is similar to a Cortex-M0+ plus integer divide instructions and TrustZone security features, and also has a 2-stage instruction pipeline.

Key features of the Cortex-M23 core are:
 ARMv8-M Baseline architecture.
 2-stage pipeline. (similar to Cortex-M0+)
 TrustZone security instructions. (available only in M23/M33/M35P)
 32-bit hardware integer divide (17 or 34 cycles). (not available in M0/M0+/M1) (slower than divide in all other cores)
 Stack limit boundaries. (available only with SAU option) (available in M23/M33/M35P)

Silicon options:
 Hardware integer multiply speed: 1 or 32 cycles.
 Hardware integer divide speed: 17 or 34 cycles maximum. Depending on divisor, instruction may complete in fewer cycles.
 Optional Memory Protection Unit (MPU): 0, 4, 8, 12, 16 regions.
 Optional Security Attribution Unit (SAU): 0, 4, 8 regions.
 Single-cycle I/O port (available in M0+/M23).
 Micro Trace Buffer (MTB) (available in M0+/M23/M33/M35P).

Chips
The following microcontrollers are based on the Cortex-M23 core:
 GigaDevice GD32E230
 Microchip SAM L10, L11
 Nuvoton M2351
 Renesas S1JA, RA2A1, RA2L1, RA2E1, RA2E2

Cortex-M33

The Cortex-M33 core was announced in October 2016 and based on the ARMv8-M architecture that was previously announced in November 2015.  Conceptually the Cortex-M33 is similar to a cross of Cortex-M4 and Cortex-M23, and also has a 3-stage instruction pipeline.

Key features of the Cortex-M33 core are:
 ARMv8-M Mainline architecture.
 3-stage pipeline.
 TrustZone security instructions. (available only in M23/M33/M35P)
 32-bit hardware integer divide (11 cycles maximum). (not available in M0/M0+/M1)
 Stack limit boundaries. (available only with SAU option) (available in M23/M33/M35P)

Silicon options:
 Optional Floating-Point Unit (FPU): single-precision only IEEE-754 compliant. It is called the FPv5 extension.
 Optional Memory Protection Unit (MPU): 0, 4, 8, 12, 16 regions.
 Optional Security Attribution Unit (SAU): 0, 4, 8 regions.
 Micro Trace Buffer (MTB) (available in M0+/M23/M33/M35P).

Chips
The following microcontrollers are based on the Cortex-M33 core:
 Analog Devices ADUCM410, ADUCM420
 Dialog DA1469x
 GigaDevice GD32E50x, GD32W515
 Nordic nRF91, nRF5340
 NXP LPC5500, i.MX RT600
 Renesas RA4, RA6
 ST STM32 H5, L5, U5
 Silicon Labs Wireless Gecko Series 2

Cortex-M35P

The Cortex-M35P core was announced in May 2018 and based on the Armv8-M architecture. It is conceptually a Cortex-M33 core with a new instruction cache, plus new tamper-resistant hardware concepts borrowed from the ARM SecurCore family, and configurable parity and ECC features.

Currently, information about the Cortex-M35P is limited, because its Technical Reference Manual and Generic User Guide haven't been released yet.

Chips
The following microcontrollers are based on the Cortex-M35P core:
 STMicroelectronics ST33K1

Cortex-M55

The Cortex-M55 core was announced in February 2020 and based on the Armv8.1-M architecture. It has a 4 or 5 stage instruction pipeline.

Key features of the Cortex-M55 core include:
 ARMv8.1-M Mainline/Helium architecture.
 4-stage pipeline.
 Stack limit boundaries (available only with SAU option).

Silicon options:
 Helium (M-Profile Vector Extension, MVE)
 Single-Precision and Double-Precision floating-point
 Digital Signal Processing (DSP) extension support
 TrustZone security extension support
 Safety and reliability (RAS) support
 Coprocessor support
 Secure and Non-secure MPU with 0, 4, 8, 12, or 16 regions
 SAU with 0, 4, or 8 regions
 Instruction cache with size of 4 KB, 8 KB, 16 KB, 32 KB, 64 KB
 Data cache with size of 4 KB, 8 KB, 16 KB, 32 KB, 64 KB
 ECC on caches and TCMs
 1–480 interrupts
 3–8 exception priority bits
 Internal and external WIC options, optional CTI, ITM, and DWT
 ARM Custom Instructions (available in a future release)

Chips
 Alif Semiconductor Ensemble and Crescendo MCU families offer single or dual Cortex-M55 cores, each paired with Ethos-U55 NPUs

Cortex-M85

The Cortex-M85 core was announced in April 2022 and based on the Armv8.1-M architecture. It has a 7-stage instruction pipeline.

Chips
 Renesas RA

Development tools

Documentation
The documentation for ARM chips is extensive.  In the past, 8-bit microcontroller documentation would typically fit in a single document, but as microcontrollers have evolved, so has everything required to support them.  A documentation package for ARM chips typically consists of a collection of documents from the IC manufacturer as well as the CPU core vendor (ARM Limited).

A typical top-down documentation tree is:

Documentation tree (top to bottom)
 IC manufacturer website.
 IC manufacturer marketing slides.
 IC manufacturer datasheet for the exact physical chip.
 IC manufacturer reference manual that describes common peripherals and aspects of a physical chip family.
 ARM core website.
 ARM core generic user guide.
 ARM core technical reference manual.
 ARM architecture reference manual.

IC manufacturers have additional documents, such as: evaluation board user manuals, application notes, getting started guides, software library documents, errata, and more. See External links section for links to official Arm documents.

See also
 ARM architecture
 List of ARM architectures and cores
 Interrupt, Interrupt handler
 Real-time operating system, Comparison of real-time operating systems

References

Further reading
 Designer's Guide to the Cortex-M Processor Family; 3rd Ed; Trevor Martin; 648 pages; 2022; .
 Definitive Guide to the ARM Cortex-M0 and Cortex-M0+ Processors; 2nd Ed; Joseph Yiu; 784 pages; 2015; .
 Definitive Guide to the ARM Cortex-M3 and Cortex-M4 Processors; 3rd Ed; Joseph Yiu; 864 pages; 2013; .
 Definitive Guide to the ARM Cortex-M23 and Cortex-M33 Processors; 1st Ed; Joseph Yiu; 928 pages; 2020; .
 Embedded Systems with ARM Cortex-M Microcontrollers in Assembly Language and C; 4th Ed; Yifeng Zhu; 730 pages; 2023; .
 ARM Assembly for Embedded Applications; 5th Ed; Daniel Lewis; 379 pages; 2019; .
 Assembly Language Programming: ARM Cortex-M3; 1st Ed; Vincent Mahout; 256 pages; 2012; .
 Digital Signal Processing and Applications Using the ARM Cortex-M4; 1st Ed; Donald Reay; 320 pages; 2015; .
 Hands-On RTOS with Microcontrollers; 1st Ed; Brian Amos; 496 pages; 2020; .

External links

ARM Cortex-M official documents
 ARM Cortex-M official website
 Cortex-M for Beginners arm.com
 ARMv8-M Security Extensions arm.com
 Cortex Microcontroller Software Interface Standard (CMSIS) arm.com

{| class="wikitable"
|-
! ARMcore !! Bitwidth !! ARMwebsite !! ARM genericuser guide !! ARM technicalreference manual !! ARM architecturereference manual
|-
| style="background: LightCyan; text-align: center;" | Cortex-M0 || style="text-align: center;" | 32 || style="text-align: center;" | Link || style="text-align: center;" | Link || style="text-align: center;" | Link || style="text-align: center;" | ARMv6-M
|-
| style="background: LightCyan; text-align: center;" | Cortex-M0+ || style="text-align: center;" | 32 || style="text-align: center;" | Link || style="text-align: center;" | Link || style="text-align: center;" | Link || style="text-align: center;" | ARMv6-M
|-
| style="background: LightCyan; text-align: center;" | Cortex-M1 || style="text-align: center;" | 32 || style="text-align: center;" | Link || style="text-align: center;" | Link || style="text-align: center;" | Link || style="text-align: center;" | ARMv6-M
|-
| style="background: LightCyan; text-align: center;" | Cortex-M3 || style="text-align: center;" | 32 || style="text-align: center;" | Link || style="text-align: center;" | Link || style="text-align: center;" | Link || style="text-align: center;" | ARMv7-M
|-
| style="background: LightCyan; text-align: center;" | Cortex-M4 || style="text-align: center;" | 32 || style="text-align: center;" | Link || style="text-align: center;" | Link || style="text-align: center;" | Link || style="text-align: center;" | ARMv7E-M
|-
| style="background: LightCyan; text-align: center;" | Cortex-M7 || style="text-align: center;" | 32 || style="text-align: center;" | Link || style="text-align: center;" | Link || style="text-align: center;" | Link || style="text-align: center;" | ARMv7E-M
|-
| style="background: LightCyan; text-align: center;" | Cortex-M23 || style="text-align: center;" | 32 || style="text-align: center;" | Link || style="text-align: center;" | Link || style="text-align: center;" | Link || style="text-align: center;" | ARMv8-M
|-
| style="background: LightCyan; text-align: center;" | Cortex-M33 || style="text-align: center;" | 32 || style="text-align: center;" | Link || style="text-align: center;" | Link || style="text-align: center;" | Link || style="text-align: center;" | ARMv8-M
|-
| style="background: LightCyan; text-align: center;" | Cortex-M35P || style="text-align: center;" | 32 || style="text-align: center;" | Link ||  ||  || style="text-align: center;" | ARMv8-M
|-
| style="background: LightCyan; text-align: center;" | Cortex-M55 || style="text-align: center;" | 32 || style="text-align: center;" | Link || style="text-align: center;" | Link || style="text-align: center;" | Link || style="text-align: center;" | ARMv8.1-M
|-
| style="background: LightCyan; text-align: center;" | Cortex-M85 || style="text-align: center;" | 32 || style="text-align: center;" | Link || style="text-align: center;" | Link || style="text-align: center;" | Link || style="text-align: center;" | ARMv8.1-M
|}

Quick reference cards
 Instructions: Thumb-1 (1), ARM and Thumb-2 (2), Vector Floating-Point (3) arm.com
 Opcodes: Thumb-1 (1, 2), ARM (3, 4), GNU Assembler Directives (5).

Migrating
 Migrating from 8051 to Cortex-M3 – arm.com
 Migrating from PIC to Cortex-M3 – arm.com
 Migrating from ARM7TDMI to Cortex-M3 – arm.com
 Migrating from Cortex-M4 to Cortex-M7 – keil.com

Other
 Bit Banding on STM32 Cortex-M microcontrollers

ARM processors